Mexico–Netherlands relations are the diplomatic relations between Mexico and the Netherlands. Both nations are members of the Organisation for Economic Co-operation and Development and the United Nations.

History 
The Netherlands was the second European country to recognize Mexico soon after gaining independence from Spain in 1821. That same year, the Netherlands began transporting goods between Mexico and Europe as the Netherlands was seen as a "neutral" nation during disputes between France and Spain. In 1825, Mexico named a consul-general in Amsterdam. In 1826, the Netherlands appointed a consul-general in Mexico City. Diplomatic relations were officially established between both nations on 15 June 1827 with the signing of the Treaty of Friendship, Navigation and Commerce. In 1828, Mexico opened a resident diplomatic mission in The Hague and soon after, a representative office as well.

Between 1864 - 1878, diplomatic relations were suspended by Mexican President Benito Juárez after the Dutch government recognized the government of Emperor Maximilian I in Mexico by French occupational forces of Emperor Napoleon III. This period was known as the Second Mexican Empire. In 1940, the Mexican legation in The Hague was closed as a result of the Second World War and was re-opened in 1946. In May 1954, both nations elevated their diplomatic representations to embassies, respectively. In 1963, President Adolfo López Mateos became the first Mexican head-of-state to visit the Netherlands. In 1964, Dutch Queen Juliana paid an official visit to Mexico, becoming the first Dutch monarch to visit the country. In November 2009, Queen Beatrix also paid an official visit to Mexico.

In 2018, both nations celebrated 190 years of friendship. That same year, Mexican President Enrique Peña Nieto paid an official visit to the Netherlands to celebrate the anniversary. In 2017, the Netherlands Business Support Office (NBSO) opened a trade office in Querétaro City to promote trade relations between central Mexico and the Netherlands. ProMéxico also opened an office in The Hague to promote and increase trade between both nations.

High-level visits

High-level visits from Mexico to the Netherlands

 President Adolfo López Mateos (1963)
 President Vicente Fox (2003)
 President Enrique Peña Nieto (2018)

High-level visits from the Netherlands to Mexico

 Queen Juliana of the Netherlands (1964)
 Prime Minister Jan Peter Balkenende (2004)
 Queen Beatrix of the Netherlands (2009)
 King Willem-Alexander of the Netherlands (2009)
 Queen Máxima of the Netherlands (2009, 2011, 2016)

Bilateral agreements 
Both nations have signed several bilateral agreement such as an Treaty of Friendship, Navigation and Commerce (1827); Extradition Treaty (1907); Trade Agreement (1950); Treaty for Cultural Relations (1964); Air Transportation Agreement (1971); Agreement to Avoid Double Taxation and Prevent Tax Evasion in Taxes on Income (1993); Agreement for the Reciprocal Promotion and Protection of Investments (1998); Agreement between Mexico and the Netherlands in relation to the Netherlands Antilles on the Exchange of Information on Tax Matters (2009) and an Agreement between Mexico and Netherlands, with respect to Aruba, for the Exchange of Information with Respect for Taxes (2013).

Tourism and Transportation 
In 2017, 75,000 Dutch citizens visited Mexico for tourism. There are direct flights between both nations with the following airlines: Aeroméxico, KLM and TUI fly Netherlands.

Trade relations 

In 1997, Mexico signed a Free Trade Agreement with the European Union (which includes the Netherlands). In 2017, total trade between the two nations amounted to US$5 billion. Mexico's main exports to the Netherlands include: machines and apparatus; crude oil; memory units; control units or adapters; motors for elevators; avocados and fruit juices. The Netherlands main exports to Mexico include: gasoline, ether, foundry manufactures; and dairy products. The Netherlands is the fifth largest foreign investor in Mexico. Between 1999 and 2018, the Netherlands invested US$20 billion in Mexico. Several Dutch companies operate in Mexico such as C&A, Heineken, Philips and Rabobank (among others). Mexican multinational company Cemex operates in the Netherlands.

Resident diplomatic missions 
 Mexico has an embassy in The Hague.
 Netherlands has an embassy in Mexico City.

See also 
 Foreign relations of Mexico
 Foreign relations of the Netherlands
 Dutch Mexicans

References 

 
Netherlands
Mexico